Lillach is a river of Bavaria, Germany. It flows into the Aubach in Weißenohe.

See also
List of rivers of Bavaria

Rivers of Bavaria
Rivers of Germany